Whaler is the second album by American singer-songwriter Sophie B. Hawkins, released in 1994 on Columbia Records. The release was preceded by the single "Right Beside You", which reached No. 56 on the Billboard Chart, but did much better in the UK, where it peaked at No. 13.

The album was not as commercially successful as her debut album Tongues and Tails two years earlier; however, the sales picked up after the third single, "As I Lay Me Down", released at the beginning of 1995, went to No. 1 on the Adult Contemporary chart. Consequently, the album managed to climb to No. 65 on the Billboard Album Chart.

Critical reception
The critical reception was mixed. Paul Evans of Rolling Stone said that the album did not quite live up to the standard and expectations set by her debut. The Los Angeles Times review noted that Hawkins tries to knit "a crazy quilt of styles" trying to combine different influences but the experimentation does not pay off and "unravels at the seams", and the only tracks that do work are the mainstream ones, such as the "dance-floor-friendly" opening track "Right Beside You" and the "anguished" ballad "I Need Nothing Else". Other reviews were more favorable, praising the album's subdued and subtle melodies, which make the album overall more consistent than her debut outing, and describing some tracks as "irresistibly catchy".

Track listing
All songs written by Sophie B. Hawkins, except where noted.

"Right Beside You" (Chertoff, Hawkins, Lerman) – 4:47
"Did We Not Choose Each Other" – 4:25
"Don't Don't Tell Me No" – 4:53
"As I Lay Me Down" – 4:08
"Swing from Limb to Limb (My Home Is in Your Jungle)" – 4:15
"True Romance" – 2:23
"Let Me Love You Up" – 3:26
"Only Love (The Ballad of Sleeping Beauty)" – 5:05
"I Need Nothing Else" – 4:17
"Sometimes I See" – 4:40
"Mr. Tugboat Hello" – 5:30

Personnel

Musicians
Sophie B. Hawkins – percussion, keyboards, vocals
Neil Conti – drums
Luís Jardim – percussion
Stephen Lipson – bass
Peter-John Vettese – keyboards

Production
Producer: Steve Lipson
Engineer: Heff Moraes
Programming: Sophie B. Hawkins, Steve Lipson

Charts

Album

Singles

References

External links
 Full lyrics of all tracks at official website

1994 albums
Sophie B. Hawkins albums
Columbia Records albums
Albums produced by Stephen Lipson